Gelendost is a town and district of Isparta Province in the Mediterranean region of Turkey. The population is 5,219 as of 2010.

References

External links
 District governor's official website 
 District municipality's official website 

Populated places in Isparta Province
Gelendost District
Districts of Isparta Province
Towns in Turkey